Cryptodaphne is a genus of sea snails, marine gastropod mollusks in the family Raphitomidae.

Species
Species within the genus Cryptodaphne include:
 Cryptodaphne adiaphora Morassi & Bonfitto, 2010
 Cryptodaphne affinis (Schepman, 1913)
 † Cryptodaphne chattica Lozouet, 2017 
 Cryptodaphne gradata (Schepman, 1913)
 Cryptodaphne kilburni Morassi & Bonfitto, 2006
 † Cryptodaphne pseudodrillia Powell, 1942 
 Cryptodaphne rugosa Sysoev, 1997
 † Cryptodaphne semilirata (Powell, 1942) †
Species brought into synonymy
 Cryptodaphne abbreviata (Schepman, 1913): synonym of Buccinaria abbreviata (Schepman, 1913)
 Cryptodaphne biconica (Schepman, 1913): synonym of Acamptodaphne biconica (Schepman, 1913)
 Cryptodaphne kennicotti (Dall, 1871): synonym of Suavodrillia kennicotti (Dall, 1871)

References

 Powell A.W.B. (1942). The New Zealand Recent and fossil Mollusca of the family Turridae with general notes on turrid nomenclature and systematics. Bulletin of the Auckland Institute and Museum. 2: 1-188, 14 pls.
 Morassi & Bonfitto, New raphitomine gastropods (Gastropoda: Conidae: Raphitominae) from the South-West Pacific

External links
  Bouchet P., Kantor Yu.I., Sysoev A. & Puillandre N. (2011) A new operational classification of the Conoidea. Journal of Molluscan Studies 77: 273-308
 
 Worldwide Mollusc Species Data Base: Raphitomidae

 
Raphitomidae